Peter Wright, was bass guitar player and vocalist for anarchist punk band Crass, from 1977 until 1984. Occasionally he is credited as Pete Wrong on the band's record covers. After the dissolution of Crass he formed the performance art duo, Judas II.

References

Living people
Crass members
Anarcho-punk musicians
English anarchists
English punk rock singers
English punk rock bass guitarists
Year of birth missing (living people)